The House of Liechtenstein, from which the principality takes its name, is the family which reigns by hereditary right over the principality of Liechtenstein. Only dynastic members of the family are eligible to inherit the throne. The dynasty's membership, rights and responsibilities are defined by a law of the family, which is enforced by the reigning prince and may be altered by vote among the family's dynasts, but which may not be altered by the Government or Parliament of Liechtenstein.

History
The family originates from Liechtenstein Castle in Lower Austria (near Vienna), which the family possessed from at least 1140 to the 13th century, and from 1807 onwards. Heinrich I von Liechtenstein (d. 1265) was lord of Nikolsburg, Liechtenstein and Petronell.

Through the centuries, the dynasty acquired vast swathes of land, predominantly in Moravia, Lower Austria, Silesia and Styria, though in all cases, these territories were held in fief under other more senior feudal lords, particularly under various lines of the Habsburg family, to whom several Liechtenstein princes served as close advisers. Thus, without any territory held directly under the Imperial throne, the Liechtenstein dynasty was unable to meet a primary requirement to qualify for a seat in the Imperial Diet (Reichstag).

A seat in the Imperial government would add power, and would be afforded by lands which would be immediate, or held without any feudal personage other than the Holy Roman Emperor himself having rights on the land. The head of the family was able to arrange the purchase from the Hohenems family of the minuscule Lordship of Schellenberg in 1699, and the County of Vaduz in 1712. Schellenberg and Vaduz indeed had no feudal lord other than their comital sovereign and the suzerain Emperor.

On 23 January 1719, after the purchase had been made, Charles VI as Holy Roman Emperor decreed Vaduz and Schellenberg to be united and raised to the dignity of a Principality by the name of "Liechtenstein", in honour of "[his] true servant, Anton Florian of Liechtenstein". On this date, Liechtenstein became a member state of the Holy Roman Empire. The Princes of Liechtenstein did not set foot in their new principality for several decades, a testament to the pure political expediency of the purchases.

According to the Constitution of the Princely House of Liechtenstein of 26 October 1993, all members other than the reigning prince shall bear the titles of Prince or Princess of Liechtenstein and Count or Countess of Rietberg.

21st-century princely family (closest members)

The Prince (the monarch)
The Hereditary Prince and Hereditary Princess (the Prince's son and daughter-in-law)
 Prince Joseph Wenzel (the Prince's grandson)
 Princess Marie Caroline (the Prince's granddaughter)
 Prince Georg (the Prince's grandson)
 Prince Nikolaus (the Prince's grandson)
 Prince Maximilian and Princess Angela (the Prince's son and daughter-in-law)
 Prince Alfons (the Prince's grandson)
 Prince Constantin and Princess Marie (the Prince's son and daughter-in-law)
 Prince Moritz (the Prince's grandson)
 Princess Georgina (the Prince's granddaughter)
 Prince Benedikt (the Prince's grandson)
 Princess Tatjana and Baron Philipp von Lattorff (the Prince's daughter and son-in-law)
 Baron Lukas von Lattorff (the Prince's grandson)
 Elisabeth von Latorff (the Prince's granddaughter)
 Marie von Latorff (the Prince's granddaughter)
 Camilla von Latorff (the Prince's granddaughter)
 Anna von Latorff (the Prince's granddaughter)
 Sophie von Latorff (the Prince's granddaughter)
 Maximilian von Lattorff (the Prince's grandson)
 Prince Philipp and Princess Isabelle (the Prince's brother and sister-in-law)
 Prince Alexander and Princess Astrid (the Prince's nephew and niece-in-law)
 Princess Theodora (the Prince's great-niece)
 Prince Wenzeslaus (the Prince's nephew)
 Prince Rudolf and Princess Tılsım (the Prince's nephew and niece-in-law)
 Princess Laetitia (the Prince's great-niece)
 Prince Karl Ludwig (the Prince's great-nephew)
 Prince Nikolaus and Princess Margaretha (the Prince's brother and sister-in-law)
 Princess Maria-Anunciata and Emanuele Musini (the Prince's niece and nephew-in-law)
 Princess Marie-Astrid and Raphael Worthington (the Prince's niece and nephew-in-law)
 Althaea Worthington (the Prince's great-niece).
 Prince Josef-Emanuel and Princess Maria Claudia (the Prince's nephew and niece-in-law)
The Dowager Marchioness of Mariño (the Prince's sister)
 María Teresa Sartorius y Liechtenstein (the Prince's niece)

Tree list
Below are all male and male-line dynastic descendants of Johann I Joseph, Prince of Liechtenstein. The numbers represent the positions in the line of succession.

  Prince Johann I Josef (1760–1836)
  Prince Alois II (1796–1858)
  Prince Johann II (1840–1929)
  Prince Franz I (1853–1938)
 Prince Franz de Paula (1802–1887)
 Prince Alfred (1842–1907)
 Prince Franz de Paula (1868–1929)
 Prince Alois (1869–1955)
  Prince Franz Josef II (1906–1989)
  Prince Hans-Adam II (born 1945)
 (1) Hereditary Prince Alois (b. 1968)
 (2) Prince Joseph Wenzel (b. 1995)
 (3) Prince Georg (b. 1999)
 (4) Prince Nikolaus (b. 2000)
 (5) Prince Maximilian (b. 1969)
 (6) Prince Alfons (b. 2001)
 (7) Prince Constantin (b. 1972)
 (8) Prince Moritz (b. 2003)
 (9) Prince Benedikt (b. 2008)
 (10) Prince Philipp (b. 1946)
 (11) Prince Alexander (b. 1972)
 (12) Prince Wenzeslaus (b. 1974)
 (13) Prince Rudolf (b. 1975)
 (14) Prince Karl Ludwig (b. 2016)
 (15) Prince Nikolaus (b. 1947)
 Prince Leopold (1984)
 (16) Prince Josef-Emanuel (b. 1989)
 Prince Franz Josef "Wenzel" (1962–1991)
 Prince Karl Alfred (1910–1985)
 Prince Dominik (1950–2009)
 (17) Prince Andreas (b. 1952)
 (18) Prince Gregor (b. 1954)
 Prince Georg Hartmann (1911–1998)
 (19) Prince Christoph (b. 1958)
 Prince Ulrich Dietmar (1913–1978)
 Prince Alois Heinrich (1917–1967)
 Prince Heinrich Hartneid (1920–1993)
 (20) Prince Hubertus (b. 1971)
 Prince Johannes (1873–1959)
 Prince Alfred (1907–1991)
 (21) Prince Franz (b. 1935)
 (22) Prince Alfred (b. 1972)
 (23) Prince Franz (b. 2009)
 (24) Prince Lukas (b. 1974)
 Prince Friedrich (1937–2010)
 (25) Prince Emanuel (b. 1978)
 (26) Prince Leopold (b. 2010)
 (27) Prince Heinrich (b. 2012)
 (28) Prince Ulrich (b. 1983)
 (29) Prince Anton (b. 1940)
 (30) Prince Georg (b. 1977)
 Prince Emanuel (1908–1987)
 Prince Johannes (1910–1975)
 (31) Prince Eugen (b. 1939)
 (32) Prince Johannes (b. 1969)
 Prince Albrecht (b. 1940) (took the title of Baron von Lanškroun)
 Prince Constantin (1911–2001)
 Prince Alfred Roman (1875–1930)
 Prince Hans-Moritz (1914–2004)
 (33) Prince Gundakar (b. 1949)
 (34) Prince Johann (b. 1993)
 (35) Prince Gabriel (b. 1998)
 (36) Prince Alfred (b. 1951)
 (37) Prince Karl (b. 1955)
 (38) Prince Hugo (b. 1964)
 Prince Heinrich (1916–1991)
 Prince Vincenz (1950–2008)
 (39) Prince Michael (b. 1951)
 (40) Prince Christof (b. 1956)
 (41) Prince Karl (b. 1957)
 Prince Heinrich (1877–1915)
 Prince Karl Aloys (1878–1955)
 Prince Wilhelm (1922–2006) (took the title of Graf von Hohenau)
 (42) Prince Wolfgang (b. 1934)
 (43) Prince Leopold (b. 1978)
 (44) Prince Lorenz (b. 2012)
 Prince Georg (Pater Ildefons, O.S.B.) (1880–1931)
 Prince Aloys (1846–1920)
 Prince Heinrich (1853–1914)
 Prince Karl Johann (1803–1871)
 Prince Rudolf (1833–1888)
 Prince Philipp (1837–1901)
 Prince Karl (1862–1893)
 Prince Joseph (1863)
 Prince Friedrich (1807–1885)
 Prince Eduard Franz (1809–1864)
 Prince Aloys (1840–1885)
 Prince Friedrich (1871–1959)
 Prince Aloys (1898–1943)
 Prince Luitpold (1940–2016)
 Prince Friedrich (1970)
 (45) Prince Carl (b. 1978)
 Prince Alfred (1900–1972)
 Prince Alexander (1929–2012)
 (46) Prince Christian (b. 1961)
 (47) Prince Augustinus (b. 1992)
 (48) Prince Johannes (b. 1995)
 (49) Prince Archer (b. 2004)
 (50) Prince Stefan (b. 1961)
 (51) Prince Lukas (b. 1990)
 (52) Prince Konrad (b. 1992)
 (53) Prince Emanuel (b. 1964)
 (54) Prince Josef (b. 1998)
 Prince Franz de Paula (1935–1987)
 Prince Alexander (1901–1926)
 Prince Eduard (1872–1951)
 Prince Johannes (1899–1979)
 Prince Ferdinand (1901–1981)
 Prince August (1810–1824)
 Prince Rudolf (1816–1848)

Palaces and residences

See also
Liechtenstein Museum (for the important princely art collection)
Line of succession to the Liechtensteiner throne
List of monarchs of Liechtenstein
List of princesses consort of Liechtenstein

References

External links 

 

 
Liechtenstein Roman Catholics
Roman Catholic families
Moravian noble families
Austrian princes
Noble families of the Holy Roman Empire